Jessica Nery Plata Noriega (born 17 May 1994) is a Mexican professional boxer. She has held the WBA world female light flyweight title since 2022 and challenged for the WBC interim female light flyweight title in 2017. As of May 2020, she is ranked as the world's second best active female light flyweight by BoxRec.

Professional career
Plata made her professional debut on 9 July 2011, scoring a four-round majority decision (MD) victory against Estrella Valverde at the Jose Cuervo Salon in Mexico City, Mexico. 

After three more wins, one by stoppage, she defeated Ibeth Zamora Silva via unanimous decision (UD) over ten rounds, capturing the WBC Youth female light flyweight title on 21 April 2012 at the Estadio José Lerma Pérez in Ocoyoacac, Mexico. She won her next ten fights, defending her WBC Youth title seven times, before suffering the first defeat of her career via UD on 1 August 2015 against former world champion Esmeralda Moreno, in a non-title fight, at the Auditorio del Bicentenario in Morelia, Mexico. The three judges scored the bout 98–92, 97–93 and 96–94 in favour of Moreno.

Following defeat she secured five wins, one by stoppage, before facing Maria Magdalena Rivera on 14 October 2017 at the Poliforum in Ocotlán, Mexico, with the vacant WBF female flyweight title on the line. Plata captured the lightly regarded world title via UD, with two judges scoring the bout 97–93 and the third scoring it 96–94.

Her next fight came the following month on 18 November against Kenia Enríquez at the Centro de Usos Multiples in Ciudad Obregón, Mexico, with Enriquez' WBC interim female light flyweight title up for grabs. Plata was knocked to the canvas in the final seconds of the tenth and final round en route to the second defeat of her career, losing via UD with scores of 97–92, 97–93 and 96–93.

She challenged for a second interim world title in her next fight, this time against undefeated champion Silvia Torres on 14 April 2018 at the Domo Sindicato de Trabajadores IMSS in Mexico City. In a fight which she dedicated to her mother who had died in the preceding months, Plata captured the WBA interim female light flyweight title by via split decision (SD), with two judges scoring the bout 98–93 and 96–94 in favour of Plata, while the third scored it 97–94 in favour of Torres.

Professional boxing record

References

External links

Living people
1994 births
Mexican women boxers
Light-flyweight boxers
Flyweight boxers